This is a list of religious buildings in Metro Manila, Philippines, organized by religion and then by city and municipality.

Buddhism

 City of Manila
 Ching Gui Bio Temple (Binondo)
 Fo Guang Shan Mabuhay Temple (Malate)
 Nyingma Palyul Chang Chub Dargye Dharma Center (Santa Mesa)
 Karma Kagyu Buddhist Society (Santa Mesa)
 Nedo Bodhi Karma Kagyu Dharma Foundation (Santa Mesa)
 Po An Temple (Malate)
 Po Chuan Am Temple (Binondo)
 Seng Guan Temple (Narra Tondo)
 Soc Yan Buddhist Temple (Tondo)
 Teng Hai Temple (Binondo)
 Tun Chi Temple (Binondo)
 Yuan Tung Temple (Santa Cruz)
 Caloocan
 Ung Siu Si Buddhist Temple
 Malabon
 Hwa Chong Temple
 Seng Kong Temple
 Parañaque
 Kiu Pat Long Shiao Temple 
 Quezon City
 Gautama Temple
 Soka Gakkai International of the Philippines
 San Juan
 Ming Kuang Temple
 Ocean Sky Chan Monastery

Christianity

Catholic Church

Anglican Church
 Holy Trinity Church Manila (Makati)

Baptist Church

 Bethany Baptist Church(Barangay Palanan, Makati, 1235)
 Capitol City Baptist Church (Quezon City)
 First Baptist Church of Manila (Quezon City)
 First Baptist Church of Pildera (Pasay)
 International Baptist Church of Manila (Makati)
 Metropolitan Bible Baptist Church (Santa Ana)
 Onyx Fundamental Baptist Church (Paco)
 Sikatuna First Baptist Church (Quezon City)
 University Baptist Church (Sampaloc)
 Global City Bible Baptist Church (Taguig)

The Church of Jesus Christ of Latter-day Saints
 Manila Philippines Temple (Quezon City)

Episcopal Church

 National Cathedral of Saint Mary & Saint John (Quezon City)
 St. Andrew's Theological Seminary Chapel (Quezon City)
 Saint Peter's Episcopal Church (Binondo)
 Saint Stephen's Pro-Cathedral (Santa Cruz)

Iglesia Filipina Independiente

 Iglesia Filipina Independiente National Cathedral (Ermita)
 Cathedral of the Holy Child Sto. Niño (Mandaluyong)
 La Purisima Concepcion de Malabon
 Maria Clara Parish Church, Sta. Cruz, Manila
 Cathedral of the Holy Child, Pandacan, Manila
 Parish of the Holy Sepulchre, Paco, Manila
 Mission Church of Sto. Niño, Punta, Santa Ana, Manila
 Parish of the Holy Child, Tondo, Manila
 Parish of the Good Shepherd, Sampaloc, Manila
 Parish of the Holy Trinity, Libertad, Pasay
 Parish of La Purisima Concepcion, Concepcion, Marikina
 Parish of Malanday, Marikina
 Parish of St. John the Baptist, Ligid-Tipas, Taguig

Iglesia ni Cristo

 INC Central Temple (Quezon City)
 7,000 Capacity
 Local of Tondo (Tondo)
 6,000 Capacity
 Local of Capitol (Quezon City)
 3,000 Capacity

( The list is undoubtedly partial. There's thousands of church buildings by this Church alone)

Methodist Church

 Central United Methodist Church (Ermita)
 Cosmopolitan Church (Ermita)
 Iglesia Evangelica Metodista en las Islas Filipinas (Tondo)
 Knox United Methodist Church (Santa Cruz)
 Valenzuela United Methodist Church (Valenzuela)
 Pandacan United Methodist Church (Pandacan)
 Malabon Central United Methodist Church (Malabon)
 Polo Methodist Church of Valenzuela (Valenzuela)
 Puno United Methodist Church (Quezon City)
 St Mark United Methodist Church (Manila)

Pentecostal Church

 Cathedral of Praise (Ermita)
 United Pentecostal Church (Tondo)
 Jesus Christ Saves Global Outreach (Mega Church)(Cubao, Quezon City)

 Church of God Caloocan (Caloocan)

Seventh-day Adventist Church
 Seventh Day Adventist Church (Manila)
 Seventh Day Adventist Church (Malabon)
 Seventh Day Adventist Church (Taguig)

Others
 Bulwagan ng Panginoon (Pasay)
 Christ's Commission Fellowship (Pasay)
 Church of the Risen Lord (Quezon City)
 The Rock Church (Makati)
 Union Church of Manila (Makati)
 Victory Christian Fellowship (Every Nation Philippines) (Taguig)

Hinduism
 City of Manila
 Hari Ram Temple (Paco)
 Saya Aur Devi Mandir Temple (Paco)
 Quezon City
 Ramakrishna Vedanta Society

Islam

 City of Manila
 Golden Mosque
 Caloocan
 Alhuda Mosque
 Al-Noor Mosque
 Caloocan Grand Mosque
 Masjid Ibnu Abbas
 Parañaque
 Baclaran Mosque
 Peace Masjid Al-Gerande
 Pasig
 Ferdaus Mosque
 Quezon City
 Abdul-Aziz Mosque
 Ever Commonwealth Mosque
 Masjid Al-Ikhlas
 Mubarak Mosque
 Rahma Qur'anic Learning Center & Mosque
 Ulomodin Dumagay Mubarak Mosque
 San Juan
 Greenhills Mosque
 Taguig
 Blue Mosque
 Green Mosque
 Masjid An Noor

Judaism
 Makati
 Beit Yaacov Synagogue

Sikhism

City of Manila
 Khalsa Diwan Temple (Paco)

Taoism

 City of Manila
 Kim Luan Temple
 Caloocan
 Thai To Taoist Temple
 Parañaque
 Kiu Pat Hong Shiao Temple
 Pasay
 Pao Ong Kong Temple - F.B. Harrison St.
 Quezon City
 Seng Lian Temple
 Sun Tay Seng Temple - Times Street
 Valenzuela
 Pak Sieng Pao Ong Temple

References

External links
 Metro Manila and its old churches
 List of Muslim Mosques in Manila

 
Religious buildings
Manila